Blanmont Castle (Château de Blanmont) is a castle in Blanmont in the municipality of Chastre, Walloon Brabant, Wallonia, Belgium. The present buildings date from the 17th and 18th centuries, on an older site.

See also
List of castles in Belgium

Castles in Belgium
Castles in Walloon Brabant
Chastre